Richteriola is a genus of parasitic flies in the family Tachinidae. There are at least two described species in Richteriola.

Species
These two species belong to the genus Richteriola:
 Richteriola beata Richter, 1975
 Richteriola portentosa Mesnil, 1963

References

Further reading

 
 
 
 

Tachinidae
Articles created by Qbugbot